Laurenţiu Amariei (born 2 July 1973) is a Romanian wrestler. He competed in the men's Greco-Roman 130 kg at the 1996 Summer Olympics.

References

External links
 

1973 births
Living people
Romanian male sport wrestlers
Olympic wrestlers of Romania
Wrestlers at the 1996 Summer Olympics
Place of birth missing (living people)